Libraries and Information Centres in India

 Ahmedabad Library Network (ADINET)
 Bombay Science Librarian's Association (BOSLA)
 Calcutta Library Network (CALIBNET)
 Central Reference Library, Kolkata
 Defence Scientific Information and Documenation Centre (DESIDOC)
 Delhi Library Association
 Delhi Public Library
 Developing Library Network (DELNET)
 Documentation Research and Training Centre (DRTC), Bangalore
 Health Education Library for People
 Indian Association of Special Libraries and Information Centres (IASLIC)
 Indian Library Association (ILA)
 Information and Library Network (INFLIBNET), Ahmedabad
 Kerala Library Association
 Kesavan Institute of Information and Knowledge Management
 Madras Library Association
 Medical Library Association of India (MLAI)
 Mysore Library Network (MYLIBNET), Mysore
 National Centre for Science Information (NCSI), Bangalore
 National Information System for Science and Technology (NISSAT), New Delhi
 National Institute of Science Communication and Information Resources, New Delhi (Formerly INSDOC)
 National Library of India
 National Medical Library
 National Social Science Documentation Centre (NASSDOC), New Delhi
 Pune Library Network
 Raja Rammohun Roy Library Foundation
 SAARC Documentation Centre
 Satinder Kaur Ramdev Memorial Trust for Advancement of Librarianship (SATKAL)
 Small Enterprises National Documentation Centre (SENDOC)
 Society for Advancement of Library and Information Science (SALIS)
 Society for Information Science (SIS)
 Society for Information Research & Studies (SIRs)
 Special Libraries Association, Asian Chapter
 Uttar Pradesh Library Association
 Virtual Information Centre

References

Library science